Masonic Home for Children is located in Alexandria, Louisiana, United States.  It was built in 1925 by Louisiana Masons and added to the National Register of Historic Places on November 20, 1987. The home was closed in 1994 and the 70-acre site remained vacant.  In 2012, some of the buildings were partially torn down to be turned into an upscale apartment complex.

References

Neoclassical architecture in Louisiana
Renaissance Revival architecture in Louisiana
Masonic buildings completed in 1924
Masonic buildings in Louisiana
Buildings and structures in Alexandria, Louisiana
Residential buildings on the National Register of Historic Places in Louisiana
National Register of Historic Places in Rapides Parish, Louisiana